HMS Trooper (N91) was a T-class submarine of the Royal Navy. She was laid down by Scotts, Greenock and launched in March 1942.

Career
Trooper spent most of her short career serving in the Mediterranean. She sank the Italian tanker Rosario, the Italian merchant
She also damaged two other enemy vessels, and unsuccessfully attacked the Italian merchant Belluno (the former French Fort de France).

On her first operation, she took part in Operation Principal, which used human torpedoes to sink Italian ships in Palermo harbour.

Trooper sailed from Beirut on 26 September 1943, on her 8th War Patrol to cover in the Aegean Sea off the Dodecanese islands. On 14 October she challenged Levant Schooner Flotilla F8 off Alinda Bay, Leros. She failed to return on 17 October and was reported overdue on that day. She is presumed lost on German mines around Leros.

The Germans claimed that Trooper was sunk by Q-ship GA.45 on 15 October 1943. The submarine GA-45 attacked was actually HMS Torbay which escaped undamaged.

References

 
 
 

 

British T-class submarines of the Royal Navy
Ships built on the River Clyde
1942 ships
World War II submarines of the United Kingdom
Lost submarines of the United Kingdom
World War II shipwrecks in the Mediterranean Sea
Maritime incidents in October 1943
Ships lost with all hands